This article contains summaries and commentaries of the 100 stories within Giovanni Boccaccio's The Decameron.

Each story of the Decameron begins with a short heading explaining the plot of the story. The 1903 J. M. Rigg translation headings are used in many of these summaries. Commentary on the tale itself follows.

First day

Before beginning the story-telling sessions, the ten young Florentines, seven women and three men, referred to as the Brigata, gather at the Basilica di Santa Maria Novella and together decide to escape the Black Death by leaving the city to stay in a villa in the countryside for the next two weeks. Each agrees to tell one story each day for ten days. The stories are told in the garden of the first villa that the company stays at, which is located a few miles outside the city.

Under the rule of Pampinea, the first day of story-telling is open topic. Although there is no assigned theme of the tales this first day, six deal with one person censuring another and four are satires of the Catholic Church.

First tale (I, 1)
This story is told by Panfilo.

Ser Cepparello, commonly known as Ciapelletto, a notoriously wicked man, travels on business to Burgundy, a region he is unknown in, as a favor to Musciatto Franzesi. Once there, he soon falls terminally ill. The two Florentine brothers who were housing him during his stay bring a friar from a nearby convent to hear his confession and give him his last rites. Ciappelletto proceeds to tell the friar lies about his life that make him seem very pure, while pretending to cringe over venial sins. He is completely believed by the friar, who preaches a sermon on his life after he passes away. The townspeople who hear the sermon believe that he was a holy man and revere him as a saint long after Ciapelletto dies.

This first tale ridicules the then-current practice of the Roman Catholic Church of canonization by the people. The earliest source of this story is found in chapter twenty-three of Saint Sulpicius Severus's biography of Saint Martin of Tours. The biography dates from around 400 AD.

Second tale (I, 2)
This story is told by Neifile.

Abraham, a Jew of Paris, is the friend of Giannotto di Civignì, who for years has urged him to become a Christian. One day Abraham departs for Rome, telling Giannotto that he wants to see the leaders of the Church – the pope and the curia – to decide whether or not he wants to convert. Giannotto, knowing of the debauched and decadent ways of the Roman clergy, fears Abraham will never want to convert after witnessing the corruption of the Church. But when Abraham returns, he converts, concluding that if Christianity can still spread even when its hierarchy is so corrupt, it must be the true word of God.

In this caustic anti-Catholic story, the Jew converts because he logically concludes that only a religion supported by God could prosper despite the corruption of its leadership. The earliest source of this tale is in Busone da Gubbio's "Avventuroso Ciciliano", written in Italian in 1311. This tale has also been told about Muslims, including Saladin.

Third tale (I, 3)
This story is told by Filomena.

Saladin, a powerful sultan, finds that his treasury is exhausted. Melchizedek, a Jew, has money enough to cover the shortfall, but Saladin believes he is too greedy to lend it fairly. Saladin tries to trick Melchizedek into giving offense (and justifying the seizure of his wealth) by asking him whether Judaism, Christianity, or Islam is the true Word of God. Melchizedek evades the trap by comparing it to the story of a merchant who had a precious ring and three virtuous sons. Having promised the ring—and with it, his estate—to all three, the king had two equally precious copies made and gave one ring to each son. Thus it could not be determined who was heir to the estate. Likewise, it cannot be determined which faith is the truth. Saladin appreciates Melchizedek's wisdom and decides to be honest with him. In the end, Saladin gets his loan and repays it and Melchizedek gets Saladin's respect and gifts of praise for his intelligence.

Unlike other Medieval and Renaissance authors, Boccaccio treats Jewish people with respect, as this story portrays the main character as wise and in a positive light. Boccaccio may have had contact with Jews while living in Naples as a young man. The oldest source is found in a French work by Stephen of Bourbon called The Seven Gifts of the Holy Spirit. However, a slightly younger (c. 1321) Italian story in Bosone da Gubbio's L'avventuroso siciliano was Boccaccio's probable source. This tale was especially popular in the Renaissance and can be found in many versions all over Europe. It is also referred to as "The Tale of the Three Rings" and "The Legend of the Three Rings" and, according to Carlo Ginzburg, was quoted in the heresy trial of the Italian miller Menocchio.

Fourth tale (I, 4)
Dioneo, who has acquired the reputation of the most bawdy of the storytellers, narrates this tale.

A young monk seduces a young woman and is secretly observed by an elder abbot. However, he knows that he has been seen, he leaves her on pretense of finishing a task. He gives the key to his room to the abbot, who then goes to seduce the girl himself. The monk hid and watched all of this, and uses the knowledge to avoid punishment. The monk and the abbot quickly rush the woman out of the monastery, but often bring her back in.

The earliest surviving source for this anti-clerical tale is found in Cento Novelle Antiche, an Italian compilation of short stories from the end of the 13th century. Boccaccio could have possibly also taken the tale from a French fabliau, "L'Evesque qui benit sa maitresse" ("The bishop who blesses his mistress").

Fifth tale (I, 5)
Fiammetta tells this story.

The Marquis of Montferrat, on his way to the Crusades, tells King Phillip of France of his happy marriage to the beautiful Marchioness. King Phillip is entranced with the Marquis' description of her, and makes an excuse to detour to Montferrat so he can seduce her. He sends a courier ahead to tell the Marchioness that he is arriving soon and would like to be hosted and dine in the estate. The Marchioness devises a plan to keep King Phillip from her. When he arrives, she throws a banquet for King Phillip, composed entirely of hens. King Phillip asks whether there are any roosters, and the Marchioness replies that there aren't, but hens and women are the same everywhere. King Phillip, shocked by her wit and unwillingness, finishes the meal and quickly returns to the Crusade. 

The story originates from The Thousand and One Arabian Nights.

Sixth tale (I, 6)
Emilia narrates yet another anti-clerical tale, the fourth of the day so far.

A well-off man, becoming rather tipsy, rashly says that his wine is "good enough for Christ himself". The greedy inquisitor hears this and prosecutes him. After some time for attending to penances imposed upon him, he hears at a mass that "you shall receive an hundredfold and shall possess eternal life". He returns to the inquisitor and marks large amounts of "swill" being given to the poor. He commiserates with the inquisitor saying that if he receives 100 times as much in the afterlife, he would be drowned. This incenses the inquisitor, but also embarrasses him for his gluttony.

Some commentators have identified the inquisitor as Pietro della Aquila, the inquisitor of Florence in 1345.

Seventh tale (I, 7)

Filostrato tells this tale.

Bergamino, with a story of Primasso (probably Hugh Primas) and the Abbot of Cluny, finely censures a sudden excess of greed in Messer Cangrande della Scala.

Cangrande I della Scala is best known as Dante's benefactor, whom he praises in the Paradiso section of the Divine Comedy, xvii, 68.

Eighth tale (I, 8)
Lauretta narrates this tale. 

Guglielmo Borsiere by a neat retort sharply censures greed in Messer Ermino de' Grimaldi.

There is no known source for this tale. It also includes another Dante reference, this time to Inferno, xvi, 66. Dante's influence is everywhere seen in the Decameron, from its subtitle (a reference to Inferno, v) to its physical arrangement and careful attention to Medieval numerology. Also Boccaccio often tells tales about the lives of people whose souls Dante had met in his epic journey through the afterlife.

Ninth tale (I, 9)
Elissa narrates another tale of censure.

The censure of a Gascon lady converts the King of Cyprus from a churlish to an honourable temper.

Boccaccio took this story directly from Cento Novelle Antiche, in which the male character is also the King of Cyprus.

Tenth tale (I, 10)
Pampinea narrates the last tale of the day.

Master Alberto da Bologna honorably puts to shame a lady who sought occasion to put him to shame in that he was in love with her.

Second day
Filomena reigns during the second day and she assigns a topic to each of the storytellers: Misadventures that suddenly end happily.

First tale (II, 1)
Martellino pretends to be a paralytic, and makes it appear as if he were cured by being placed upon the body of St. Arrigo. His trick is detected; he is beaten and arrested, and is in peril of hanging, but finally escapes.

Neifile narrates this tale, which, like I, 1, ridicules the Catholic tradition of discerning the Saints. Although there is no known earlier source for this tale, the part where Martellino's friends are carrying him in on a cot references Mark 2:2 and Luke 5:19.

Second tale (II, 2)
Rinaldo d'Asti is robbed, arrives at Castle Guglielmo, and is entertained by a widow lady; his property is restored to him, the robbers caught and hanged, and he returns home safe and sound.

This story seems to originate in the Panchatantra, a work originally composed in Sanskrit, and was already 1,500 years old by the time Boccaccio retold it. Filostrato tells this version of the tale.

Third tale (II, 3)
Three young men squander their substance and are reduced to poverty. Their nephew, returning home a desperate man, falls in love with a woman disguised as an abbot, whom he discovers to be the daughter of the King of England. She marries him, and he retrieves the losses and reestablishes the fortune of his uncles.

Pampinea narrates this tale of which no earlier version is known.

Fourth tale (II, 4)
Landolfo Ruffolo is reduced to poverty, turns corsair, is captured by Genoese, is shipwrecked, escapes on a chest full of jewels, and, being cast ashore at Corfu, is hospitably entertained by a woman, and returns home wealthy.

Lauretta narrates.

Fifth tale (II, 5)
Andreuccio da Perugia comes to Naples to buy horses, meets with three serious adventures in one night, comes safe out of them all, and returns home with a ruby.

Fiammetta tells this story which is actually a combination of two earlier tales. The beginning of the tale is first recorded in about 1228 by Courtois d'Arrass in his "Boivin de Provins." The portion of Andreuccio being trapped in the tomb of the archbishop and how he escapes comes from the Ephesian Tale by Xenophon of Ephesus, which was written in about 150 AD. That portion of the tale is so memorable that it was still being told as a true story in the cities and countryside of Europe in the early 20th century.

Sixth tale (II, 6)
Madam Beritola loses two sons, is found with two goats on an island, goes thence to Lunigiana, where one of her sons takes service with her master, and lies with his daughter, for which he is put in prison. Sicily rebels against King Charles, the son is recognized by the mother, marries the master's daughter, and, his brother being discovered, is reinstated in great honor.

Emilia tells this story. It resembles the story of Sir Isumbras, which dates from before 1320 and was very popular in medieval England.

Seventh tale (II, 7)
The Sultan of Babylon sends one of his daughters, Alatiel, overseas, designing to marry her to the King of Algarve. By diverse adventures she comes in the space of four years into the hands of nine men in varied places. At last she is restored to her father, whom she quits again in the guise of a virgin, and, as was at first intended, is married to the King of Algarve.

This scandalous tale is told by Panfilo. There is no agreement on its origin, probably because of the very eclectic nature of the plot, which may have been pieced together from various sources by Boccaccio. Some suggest One Thousand and One Nights or the Ephesian Tale may have given some inspiration to the author for this tale, but not enough that either could definitely been called a source.

Eighth tale (II, 8)
The Count of Antwerp, laboring under a false accusation, goes into exile. He leaves his two children in different places in England, and takes service in Ireland. Returning to England an unknown man, he finds his son and daughter prosperous. He serves as a groom in the army of the King of France; his innocence is established, and he is restored to his former honors.

Elissa narrates this story, which shares its theme of a woman's vengeance for being spurned with many ancient stories. However, a direct source may be the real-life story of Pierre de La Broce and Lady of Brabant. Dante writes about the soul of the former in Purgatorio, vi. A literary source may have been a Provençal romance written in 1318 by Arnaud Vidal de Castelnaudary called Guillaume de la Barre. However, the theme is so common that pinning down one main source is very difficult.

Ninth tale (II, 9)
Bernabò of Genoa, deceived by Ambrogiuolo, loses his money and commands his innocent wife to be put to death. She escapes, habits herself as a man, and serves the Sultan. She discovers the deceiver, and brings Bernabò to Alexandria, where the deceiver is punished. She then resumes the garb of a woman, and with her husband returns wealthy to Genoa.

Filomena tells this story, which is best known to English readers through Shakespeare's Cymbeline. The oldest known version of this story is a French romance from the 13th century called Roman de la Violette ou de Gerard de Nevers by Gilbert de Montreuil.

Tenth tale (II, 10)
Paganino da Monaco carries off the wife of Messer Ricciardo di Chinzica, who, having learned where she is, goes to Paganino and in a friendly manner asks him to restore her. He consents, provided she be willing. She refuses to go back with her husband. Messer Ricciardo dies, and she marries Paganino.

In the last tale of the second day Dioneo begins his pattern of telling the last tale of the day, which he will continue until the end of the Decameron. The moral of the story – that a young woman should not marry an old man – is common in late medieval vernacular literature.

Third day

Neifile presides as queen during the third day. In these stories a person either has painfully acquired something or has lost it and then regained it.

First tale (III, 1)
Masetto da Lamporecchio feigns to be mute, and obtains a gardener's place at a convent of women, who with one accord make haste to lie with him.

Filostrato's tale of a man's devices that he employs to enjoy the physical company of a convent of nuns was also in Cento Novelle Antiche from the 13th century.

Second tale (III, 2)
A groom lies with the wife of King Agilulf, who learns the fact, keeps his own counsel, finds out the groom and shears him. The shorn shears all his fellows and so comes safe out of the scrape.

Pampinea's clever tale originates in either the Panchatantra, a Sanskrit story from the 4th century AD, or the Histories of Herodotus. However, Boccaccio's version is unique in that the husband in the tale preserves both his honor and that of his wife, and emphasis on "keeping up appearances" that is distinct of the Renaissance merchant class, to which Boccaccio belonged.

Third tale (III, 3)
Under cloak of confession and a most spotless conscience, a lady, enamored of a young man, induces a dim-witted friar unwittingly to provide a means to the entire gratification of her passion.

Filomena narrates this story.

Fourth tale (III, 4)
Dom Felice instructs Friar Puccio how to attain blessedness by doing a penance. Friar Puccio does the penance, and meanwhile Dom Felice has a good time with Friar Puccio's wife.

Panfilo narrates.

Fifth tale (III, 5)
Zima gives a palfrey to Messer Francesco Vergellesi, who in return suffers him to speak with his wife. She keeping silence, he answers in her stead, and the sequel is in accordance with his answer.

This tale is originally found in Hitopadesha, a Sanskrit collection of tales. Boccaccio, though, may have directly taken the tale from The Seven Wise Masters, which, although oriental in origin, was widely circulating in Latin at the time the Decameron was written. Elissa narrates.

Sixth tale (III, 6)
Ricciardo Minutolo loves the wife of Filippello Fighinolfi, and knowing her to be jealous, makes her believe that his own wife is to meet Filippello at a Turkish bath house on the ensuing day; whereby she is induced to go thither, where, thinking to have been with her husband, she discovers that she has tarried with Ricciardo.

Fiammetta tells this tale, which like the previous one, was taken from The Seven Wise Masters.

Seventh tale (III, 7)
Tedaldo, being in disfavour with his lady, departs from Florence. He returns after a while in the guise of a pilgrim, speaks with his lady, and makes her sensible of her fault. Her husband, convicted of slaying him, he delivers from peril of death, reconciles him with his brothers, and thereafter discreetly enjoys his lady.

Emilia narrates this tale, which has no known previous version.

Eighth tale (III, 8)
Ferondo, having taken a certain powder, is interred for dead; is disinterred by the abbot, who enjoys his wife; is put in prison and taught to believe that he is in purgatory; is then resuscitated, and rears as his own a boy begotten by the abbot upon his wife.

Lauretta's tale of the elaborate ruses that an abbot undertakes to enjoy Ferondo's wife was probably taken by Boccaccio from a French fabliau by Jean de Boves called . Boccaccio not only capitalizes on the tale to poke fun at the clerics of his day, but also at the simple-mindedness of some of his countrymen.

Ninth tale (III, 9)
Gillette of Narbonne cures the King of France of a fistula, craves for spouse Bertrand de Roussillon, who marries her against his will, and hies him in despite to Florence, where, as he courts a young woman, Gillette lies with him in her stead, and has two sons by him; for which cause he afterwards takes her into favour and entreats her as his wife.

Neifile narrates this tale, which was written first by the Sanskrit dramatist and poet Kālidāsa in his The Recognition of Śakuntalā. The time of Kālidāsa's life is uncertain, but some scholars think that he lived in the 5th century. Boccaccio may have taken the tale from an 11th-century French version. This tale is the basis for Shakespeare's play All's Well That Ends Well.

Tenth tale (III, 10)
Alibech, a non-Christian girl of Gafsa, turns hermit, and is taught by Rustico, a monk, how the Devil is put in hell. She is afterwards conveyed thence, and becomes the wife of Neerbale.

Dioneo narrates what is by far the most obscene and bawdy tale in the Decameron. Alibech, a naive young woman, wanders into the desert in an attempt to become closer to God. She happens upon the monk Rustico, and he deflowers her under the pretense of teaching her how to better please God. Alibech becomes more enthusiastic about putting the Devil back into Hell than Rustico, almost to the point of his ruin. Meanwhile, her family and family home are incinerated, leaving her the only heir. Neerbale kidnaps her, much to Rustico's relief and Alibech's displeasure, and Alibech is made to marry Neerbale. The night before the wedding, she is questioned by other women as to how Alibech served God in the desert, and upon explaining to her ladies how the Devil is put back into Hell, is informed that Neerbale will surely know how to help her serve God once more.

Because of its "graphic" nature, this tale has at times been translated incompletely, as in John Payne's translation, where Alibech's sexual awakening is left untranslated and is accompanied with this footnote: "The translators regret that the disuse into which magic has fallen, makes it impossible to render the technicalities of that mysterious art into tolerable English; they have therefore found it necessary to insert several passages in the original Italian." No known earlier versions of it exist.

Fourth day
Boccaccio begins this day with a defense of his work as it is thus far completed. Although he says that portions of the earlier days were circulating among the literate citizens of Tuscany while the work was in progress, this is doubtful. Instead, Boccaccio is probably just shooting down potential detractors. The reader must remember that vernacular fictional prose was not a respected genre in 14th century Italy and some of the criticisms Boccaccio combats in the introduction to the fourth day were common attitudes towards the genre. Others, however, were specific to the Decameron itself.

One criticism of the latter type was that it was not healthy for a man of Boccaccio's age – approximately 38 – to associate with young ladies, to whom the work is supposedly written. To defend against this criticism, Boccaccio tells a story explaining how natural it is for a man to enjoy a woman's company. In this story, Filipo Balducci is a hermit living with his son on Mount Asinaio after the death of his wife and travels occasionally to Florence for supplies. One day his son – now eighteen and having never before left the mountain – accompanies him because Filipo is too infirm to make the journey alone. While there the son becomes fascinated with women, even though he had never seen one before and Filipo regrets ever bringing his son to Florence.

This is commonly referred to as the 101st story of the Decameron. The story originates in the Ramayana, a Sanskrit epic from the 4th century BCE. The tale was quite common during the medieval era, appearing in Barlaam and Josaphat (written in the 8th century), an exemplum of Jacques de Vitry (13th century) and Cento Novelle Antiche (also 13th century), The Seven Wise Masters, and Italian collection of fables called Fiore di virtù (14th century), Odo of Shirton's "De heremita iuvene" (12th century), and a French fabliau (13th century). The last two are the most probable sources for Boccaccio because in them the father refers to the women as "geese", whereas in the earlier versions he calls them "demons" who tempt the souls of men.

Filostrato reigns during the fourth day, in which the storytellers tell tales of lovers whose relationship ends in disaster. This is the first day a male storyteller reigns.

First tale (IV, 1)
Tancredi, Prince of Salerno and father of Ghismonda, slays his daughter's lover, Guiscardo, and sends her his heart in a golden cup: Ghismonda, the daughter, pours upon it a poisonous distillation, which she drinks and dies.

Fiammetta narrates this tale, whose earliest source is a French manuscript written by a man named Thomas. However, it is referred to in the early 12th century of Tristan and Iseult.

Second tale (IV, 2)

Friar Alberto deceives a woman into believing that the Angel Gabriel is in love with her. As an excuse to sleep with her, Friar Alberto tells her that Gabriel can enter his body. Afterward, for fear of her kinsmen, he flings himself out of her window and finds shelter in the house of a poor man. The next day the poor man leads him in the guise of a wild man into the piazza, where, being recognized, he is apprehended by his fellow monks and imprisoned.

Pampinea tells the second tale of the day, which is a very ancient tale. Supposedly it comes from an episode in the life of Alexander the Great. Other notable previous recordings of it include Josephus's Jewish Antiquities, the Pantschantantra, and One Thousand and One Arabian Nights.

Third tale (IV, 3)
Three young men love three sisters, and flee with them to Crete. The eldest of the sisters slays her lover for jealousy. The second saves the life of the first by yielding herself to the Duke of Crete. Her lover slays her, and makes off with the first: the third sister and her lover are charged with the murder, are arrested and confess the crime. They escape death by bribing the guards, flee destitute to Rhodes, and there in destitution die.

Lauretta narrates.

Fourth tale (IV, 4)
Gerbino, in breach of the plighted faith of his grandfather, King William, attacks a ship of the King of Tunis to rescue his daughter. She is killed by those aboard the ship, Gerbino slays them, and afterward he is beheaded.

There is no known source for Elissa's tale.

Fifth tale (IV, 5)

Lisabetta's brothers slay her lover. He appears to her in a dream and shows her where he is buried. She disinters the head and sets it in a pot of basil, whereon she daily weeps a great while. Her brothers take the pot from her and she dies shortly after.

Filomena tells this story, one of the most famous in the Decameron, and the basis of John Keats' narrative poem Isabella, or the Pot of Basil.

Sixth tale (IV, 6)
Andreuola loves Gabriotto: she tells him a dream that she has had; he tells her a dream of his own, and dies suddenly in her arms. While she and her maidservant are carrying his corpse to his house, they are taken by the Signory. She tells how the matter stands, is threatened with violence by the podestà, but will not brook it. Her father hears how she is bested; and, her innocence being established, causes her to be set at large; but she, being minded to tarry no longer in the world, becomes a nun.

Panfilo, the first male storyteller of the day to narrate, tells this tale.

Seventh tale (IV, 7)
Simona loves Pasquino; they are together in a garden; Pasquino rubs a leaf of sage against his teeth, and dies; Simona is arrested, and, with intent to show the judge how Pasquino died, rubs one of the leaves of the same plant against her teeth, and likewise dies.

Emilia narrates.

Eighth tale (IV, 8)
Girolamo loves Salvestra: yielding to his mother's prayers he goes to Paris; he returns to find Salvestra married; he enters her house by stealth, lays himself by her side, and dies; he is borne to the church, where Salvestra lays herself by his side, and dies.

Neifile narrates.

Ninth tale (IV, 9)
Sieur Guillaume de Roussillon slays his wife's lover, Sieur Guillaume de Cabestaing, and gives her his heart to eat. When she finds out, she throws herself from a high window, dies, and is buried with her lover.

Filostrato tells this story, which has so many similarities with tale IV, 1 that both tales could have shared sources.

Tenth tale (IV, 10)
The wife of a leech, deeming her lover, who has taken an opiate, to be dead, puts him in a chest, which, with him therein, two usurers carry off to their house. He comes to himself, and is taken for a thief; but, the lady's maid giving the Signory to understand that she had put him in the chest which the usurers stole, he escapes the gallows, and the usurers are fined for the theft of the chest.

Dioneo, whose stories are exempt from being governed by the theme of each day, tells this tale of Buddhist origin.

Fifth day
During the fifth day Fiammetta, whose name means small flame, sets the theme of tales where lovers pass through disasters before having their love end in good fortune.

First tale (V, 1)

Cimon, by loving, waxes wise, wins his wife Iphigenia by capture on the high seas, and is imprisoned at Rhodes. He is freed by Lysimachus; and the two capture Cassandra and recapture Iphigenia in the hour of their marriage. They flee with their ladies to Crete, and having there married them, are brought back to their homes.

Like the tale in the introduction to the fourth day, Panfilo's tale seems to derive from the story of Barlaam and Josaphat.

Second tale (V, 2)
Gostanza loves Martuccio Gomito and after hearing that he is dead, gives way to despair, and hides her alone aboard a boat, which is wafted by the wind to Susa. She finds him alive in Tunis, and makes herself known to him. Having gained high place in the king's favour by way of his council, he marries Gostanza and returns with her to Lipari.

Emilia narrates this tale, one part of which (the motif of using extra fine bow strings) supposedly is based on a real event, according to a chronicle by Giovanni Villani. In Villani's story's Emperor Kassan of the Tartars thus defeated the Sultan of Egypt in 1299.

Third tale (V, 3)
Pietro Boccamazza runs away with Agnolella and encounters a gang of robbers. The girl takes refuge in the woods and is guided to a castle. Pietro is taken but escapes from the robbers. After some adventures, he arrives at the castle and marries Agnolella; they return to Rome. 

Elissa tells this tale.

Fourth tale (V, 4)
Ricciardo Manardi is found by Messer Lizio da Valbona after an affair with his daughter, whom he marries, and remains at peace with her father.

Filostrato narrates this tale, which some claim bears a resemblance to "Lai du Laustic" by the famed late 12th-century poet Marie de France. However, the resemblance is not strong and the story may be of either Boccaccio's invention or may come from oral tradition.

Fifth tale (V, 5)
Guidotto da Cremona dies leaving a girl to Giacomino da Pavia. She has two lovers in Faenza, Giannole di Severino and Minghino di Mingole, who fight about her. She is discovered to be Giannole's sister, and is given to Minghino to marry.

Neifile tells this story which has no previous literary recording.

Sixth tale (V, 6)
Gianni di Procida, being found with a damsel that he loves, and who had been given to King Frederick, is bound with her to a stake, so to be burned. He is recognized by Ruggieri dell'Oria, is freed, and marries her.

Pampinea narrates this tale.

Seventh tale (V, 7)
Teodoro is sold to Messer Amerigo as a slave when still a child. He is christened and brought up together with Violente, the daughter of his master. The two fall in love and Violente eventually bears a boy. Threatened with death by her outraged father she names the father who is sentenced to the gallows. Amerigo orders his daughter to choose between knife or poison and the child to be killed. Traveling Armenian dignitaries recognize the condemned by a strawberry shaped birth mark. Thus his life is saved as well as Violente's in the last minute. The couple get the blessing of their father, marry and live a happy life until old age.

Lauretta narrates.

Eighth tale (V, 8)
In his love for a young lady of the Traversari family, Nastagio degli Onesti squanders his wealth without being loved in return. He is entreated by his friends to leave the city, and goes away to Chiassi, where he sees a female ghost cursed to be hunted down and killed by a horseman and devoured by a pack of hounds every week. He finds out that the cursed horseman was in a similar situation to his own, and committed suicide while the woman died afterwards unrepentant for her role in his death. Nastagio then invites his kinfolk and the lady he loves to a banquet at this same place, so the ghost woman is torn to pieces before the eyes of his beloved, who, fearing a similar fate, accepts Nastagio as her husband.

Filomena's tale may originate from the early 13th century Chronicle of Helinandus. However, the tale was a widespread one and Boccaccio could have taken it from any number of sources or even oral tradition.

Ninth tale (V, 9)
Federigo degli Alberighi, who loves but is not loved in return, spends all the money he has in courtship and is left with only a falcon, which, since he has nothing else to give her, he offers to his lady to eat when she visits his home; then she, learning of this, changes her mind, takes him for her husband, and makes him rich.

Fiammetta's tale (she is the speaker in this story, contrary to what a couple of incorrect sources may say) is also told about the legendary Hatim Tai, who lived in the 6th century and sacrificed his favorite horse to provide a meal for the ambassador of the Greek Emperor. This earliest version of the tale is of Persian origin.

Tenth tale (V, 10)
Pietro di Vinciolo goes from home to eat, and his wife brings a boy into the house to bear her company. Pietro returns, and she hides her lover under a hen-coop. Pietro explains that in the house of Ercolano, with whom he was to have supped, there was discovered a young man bestowed there by Ercolano's wife. The lady censures Ercolano's wife, but unluckily an ass treads on the fingers of the boy that is hidden under the hen-coop, so that he cries out in pain. Pietro runs to the place, sees him, and apprehends the trick played on him by his wife, which nevertheless he finally condones, because he is not himself free from blame.

As is custom among the ten storytellers, Dioneo tells the last and most bawdy tale of the day. This story is taken from Lucius Apuleius's 2nd-century The Golden Ass.

Sixth day
During the sixth day of storytelling, Elissa is queen of the brigata and chooses for the theme stories in which a character avoids attack or embarrassment through a clever remark.

Many stories in the sixth day do not have previous versions. Boccaccio may have invented many of them himself. He certainly was clever enough to have created the situations and the retorts.

First tale (VI, 1)
A knight offers to carry Madonna Oretta a horseback with a story, but tells it so badly that she begs him to let her dismount.

Filomena narrates this tale, which many see as revealing Boccaccio's opinion of what makes a good or bad storyteller, just as portions of Hamlet and A Midsummer Night's Dream contain Shakespeare's opinion of what makes a good or bad actor.

Second tale (VI, 2)
Cisti, a baker, by an apt speech gives Messer Geri Spina to know that he has by inadvertence asked that of him which he should not.

Pampinea narrates.

Third tale (VI, 3)
Monna Nonna de' Pulci by a ready retort silences the scarce seemly jesting of the Bishop of Florence.

Lauretta narrates.

Fourth tale (VI, 4)
Chichibio, cook to Currado Gianfigliazzi, owes his safety to a ready answer, whereby he converts Currado's wrath into laughter, and evades the evil fate with which Currado had threatened him.

Neifile narrates.

Fifth tale (VI, 5)

Messer Forese da Rabatta, a knowledgeable jurist, and Master Giotto, a painter, make fun of each other's poor appearance while returning from Mugello.

Panfilo narrates this tale.

Sixth tale (VI, 6)
Michele Scalza proves to certain young men that the Baronci are the best gentlemen in the world and the Maremma, and wins a supper.

Fiammetta narrates.

Seventh tale (VI, 7)
Madonna Filippa, being found by her husband with her lover, is cited before the court, and by a ready and clever answer acquits herself, and brings about an alteration of the statute.

Filostrato narrates this tale which modern readers with their ideas of gender equality can appreciate.

Eighth tale (VI, 8)
Fresco admonishes his niece not to look at herself in the glass, if it is, as she says, grievous to her to see nasty folk.

Emilia narrates. Admonitions against the sin of vanity were common in the medieval era.

Ninth tale (VI, 9)
Guido Cavalcanti by a quip neatly rebukes certain Florentine gentlemen who had taken advantage of him.

Elissa narrates.

Tenth tale (VI, 10)

Friar Cipolla promises to show certain country-folk a feather of the Angel Gabriel, in lieu of which he finds coals, which he claims are those with which Saint Lawrence was roasted.

Dioneo narrates this story which mocks the worship of relics. The story originates in the Sanskrit collection of stories called Canthamanchari. This story—a classic from the collection—takes place in Certaldo, Boccaccio's hometown (and the location where he would later die). Friar Cipolla's name means "Brother Onion," and Certaldo was famous in that era for its onions. In the story one can sense a certain love on Boccaccio's part for the people of Certaldo, even while he is mocking them.

Seventh day
During the seventh day Dioneo serves as king of the brigata and sets the theme for the stories: tales in which wives play tricks on their husbands.

First tale (VII, 1)
Gianni Lotteringhi hears a knocking at his door at night: he awakens his wife, who persuades him that it is a werewolf, which they fall to exorcising with a prayer; whereupon the knocking ceases.

Emilia tells the first tale of the day. In it Boccaccio states that he heard it from an old woman who claimed it was a true story and heard it as a child. Although we will never know if Boccaccio really did hear the story from an old woman or not (it is possible), the story is certainly not true. It resembles an earlier French fabliau by Pierre Anfons called "Le revenant". Also, the English description of the creature as a "werewolf" is improper. The Italian word, describes a supernatural cat monkey creature or quite simply a ghost.

Second tale (VII, 2)
Her husband returning home, Peronella hides her lover in a barrel; which, being sold by her husband, she claims she had already sold to someone currently examining it from the inside to see if it is sound. The lover jumps out, and explains that the barrel is not clean enough and that it must be cleaned properly for the purchase to take place. The husband thus cleans it, his head inside the barrel; the wife too, sticks her head in there, instructing. Meanwhile the lover has his way with the wife from behind, and afterwards has the husband carry the barrel to his house.

Filostrato narrates this tale, which Boccaccio certainly took from Apuleius's The Golden Ass, the same source as tale V, 10.

Third tale (VII, 3)
Friar Rinaldo lies with his godchild's mother: her husband finds him in the room with her; and they make him believe that he was curing his godson of worms by a charm.

Elissa tells this tale, which has so many similar versions in French, Italian, and Latin, that it is impossible to identify one as a potential source for this one. The relationship between a child's godparent and biological parent was considered so sacred at the time that intercourse between them was considered incest. This belief is ridiculed by Boccaccio in a later tale (VII, 10).

Fourth tale (VII, 4)
Tofano one night locks his wife out of the house. Finding that she cannot convince him to let her in, she pretends to throw herself into a well, throwing a large stone inside. Tofano comes out of the house, and runs to the spot, and she goes into the house, locks him out, and hurls abuse at him from within.

Lauretta is the narrator of this very old tale. The earliest form of it is found in the Sanskrit Śukasaptati (The Parrot's Seventy Tales), which was compiled in the 6th century AD. A later version from the 11th century is found in Disciplina Clericalis, which was written in Latin by Petrus Alphonsi, a Jewish convert to Christianity. The tale was very popular and appears in many vernacular languages of the era.

Fifth tale (VII, 5)
A jealous husband disguises himself as a priest, and hears his own wife's confession: she tells him that she loves a priest, who comes to her every night. The husband posts himself at the door to watch for the priest, and meanwhile the lady brings her lover in by the roof, and tarries with him.

Fiammetta's tale most likely originates from a French fabliau or a possibly Provençal romance, both of which were recorded not too long before the Decameron was written.

Sixth tale (VII, 6)
Madonna Isabella has with her Leonetto, her accepted lover, when she is surprised by Messer Lambertuccio, by whom she is beloved: her husband coming home about the same time, she sends Messer Lambertuccio forth of the house drawn sword in hand, and the husband afterwards escorts Leonetto home.

Pampinea narrates this version of a common medieval tale which originates from the Hitopadesha of India. Later versions pass the tale into Persian, French, Latin (in The Seven Wise Masters), and Hebrew.

Seventh tale (VII, 7)
Lodovico tells Madonna Beatrice the love that he has for her. She sends Egano, her husband, into a garden disguised as herself, and lies with Lodovico. Afterwards, being risen, Lodovico goes to the garden and cudgels Egano.

Filomena's humorous tale probably derives from an earlier French fabliau.

Eighth tale (VII, 8)
A husband grows jealous of his wife, and discovers that she has warning of her lover's approach by a piece of pack-thread, which she ties to her great toe at nights. While he is pursuing her lover, she puts another woman in bed in her place. The husband, finding her there, beats her, and cuts off her hair. He then goes and calls his wife's brothers, who, holding his accusation to be false, subject him to a torrent of abuse.

Neifile tells this tale. It comes originally from the Pantschatantra and later forms part of other tale collections in Sanskrit, Arabic, French, and Persian. Boccaccio probably used a French version of the tale.

Ninth tale (VII, 9)
Lydia, wife of Nicostratus, loves Pyrrhus, who to assure himself thereof, asks three things of her, all of which she does, and therewithal enjoys him in presence of Nicostratus, and makes Nicostratus believe that what he saw was not real.

Panfilo narrates. Boccaccio combined two earlier folk tales into one to create this story. The test of fidelity is previously recorded in French (a fabliau) and Latin (Lidia, an elegiac comedy), but comes originally from India or Persia. The story of the pear tree, best known to English-speaking readers from The Canterbury Tales, also originates from Persia in the Bahar-Danush, in which the husband climbs a date tree instead of a pear tree. The story could have arrived in Europe through the One Thousand and One Nights, or perhaps the version in book VI of the Masnavi by Rumi.

Tenth tale (VII, 10)

Two Sienese men love a lady, one of them being her child's godfather: the godfather dies, having promised his comrade to return to him from the other world; which he does, and tells him what sort of life is led there.

As usual, Dioneo narrates the last tale of the day. See the commentary for VII, 3 for information about the relation between a child's parent and godparent.

Eighth day
Lauretta reigns during the eighth day of storytelling. During this day the members of the group tell stories of tricks women play on men or that men play on women.

First tale (VIII, 1)
Gulfardo borrows moneys of Guasparruolo, which he has agreed to give Guasparruolo's wife, that he may lie with her. He gives them to her, and in her presence tells Guasparruolo that he has done so, and she acknowledges that it is true.

Neifile narrates. This tale (and the next one) comes from a 13th-century French fabliau by Eustache d'Amiens. English speakers know it best from Chaucer's "The Shipman's Tale". Chaucer borrowed from the same fabliau as Boccaccio did.

Second tale (VIII, 2)
The priest of Varlungo lies with Monna Belcolore: he leaves with her his cloak by way of pledge, and receives from her a mortar. He returns the mortar, and demands of her the cloak that he had left in pledge, which the good lady returns him with a gibe.

Panfilo tells this story, which can be considered a variation of VIII, 1.

Third tale (VIII, 3)
Calandrino, Bruno and Buffalmacco go in quest of the heliotrope (bloodstone) beside the Mugnone. Thinking to have found it, Calandrino gets him home laden with stones. His wife chides him: whereat he waxes wroth, beats her, and tells his comrades what they know better than he.

Elissa narrates this tale, the first in which Bruno and Buffalmacco appear. The two were early Renaissance Italian painters. However, both are known far better for their love of practical jokes than for their artistic work. Boccaccio probably invented this tale himself, though, and used well known jokers as characters.

Fourth tale (VIII, 4)
The rector of Fiesole loves a widow lady, by whom he is not loved and, in attempting to lie with her, is tricked by the lady to have sex with her maid, with whom the lady's brothers cause him to be found by his Bishop.

Emilia's tale originates from the fabliau "Le Prestre et Alison" by Guillaume Le Normand.

Fifth tale (VIII, 5)

Three young men pull down the breeches of a judge from the Marches, while he is administering justice on the bench.

Filostrato narrates.

Sixth tale (VIII, 6)
Bruno and Buffalmacco steal a pig from Calandrino, and induce him to deduce its recovery by means of pills of ginger and Vernaccia wine. Of the said pills they give him two, one after the other, made of dog-ginger compounded with aloes; and it then appearing as if he had had the pig himself, they constrain him to buy them off, if he would not have them tell his wife.

Filomena narrates. Just like Bruno and Buffalmacco, Calandrino was also in reality a 14th-century Italian Renaissance painter. However, Calandrino was known as a simpleton by his contemporaries. It is possible that this tale may be true and Boccaccio recorded it first. The test that Bruno and Buffalmacco submit Calandrino to was really a medieval lie detector test and the tale is consistent with what we know about the characters of the three painters.

Seventh tale (VIII, 7)
A scholar loves a widow lady, who, being enamoured of another, causes him to spend a winter's night awaiting her in the snow. He afterwards by a stratagem causes her to stand for a whole day in July, naked upon a tower, exposed to the flies, the gadflies, and the sun.

Pampinea tells this story of revenge over spurned love, which has many common analogues in many languages in antiquity, the Middle Ages, the Renaissance, and early modern periods.

Eighth tale (VIII, 8)
Two men keep with one another: the one lies with the other's wife: the other, being aware of it, manages with the aid of his wife to have the one locked in a chest, upon which he then lies with the wife of him that is locked therein.

Fiammetta narrates this tale. Like many of the eighth day it has a theme in common with many tales from the ancient and medieval era and it is not possible to point to one source that served as Boccaccio's inspiration.

Ninth tale (VIII, 9)
Bruno and Buffalmacco prevail upon Master Simone, a physician, to betake him by night to a certain place, there to be enrolled in a company that go the course. Buffalmacco throws him into a foul ditch, and there they leave him.

Lauretta narrates another tale about Bruno and Buffalmacco and their practical jokes. This story is probably just a vehicle for Boccaccio's ability to coin word play, just as tale VI, 10 did.

Tenth tale (VIII, 10)
A Sicilian woman cunningly conveys from a merchant that which he has brought to Palermo; he, making a show of being come back with far greater store of goods than before, borrows money of her, and leaves her in lieu thereof water and tow.

The story that Dioneo tells is found in Alphonsus's Disciplina Clericalis and the Gesta Romanorum, both of which are written in Latin.

Ninth day
Emilia is queen of the brigata for the ninth day. For the second time there is no prescribed theme for the stories of the day (the only other time was during the first day).

First tale (IX, 1)
Madonna Francesca, having two lovers, the one Rinuccio, the other Alessandro, by name, and loving neither of them, induces the one to simulate a corpse in a tomb, and the other to enter the tomb to fetch him out: whereby, neither satisfying her demands, she artfully rids herself of both.

Filomena narrates.

Second tale (IX, 2)
An abbess rises in haste and in the dark, with intent to surprise an accused nun in bed with her lover: thinking to put on her veil, she puts on instead the breeches of a priest that she has with her. The nun, after pointing out her abbess's head covering, is acquitted, and thenceforth finds it easier to meet with her lover.

Elissa is the narrator of this tale which was either taken from a fabliau by Jean de Condé written between 1313 and 1337, or from a story about Saint Jerome in The Golden Legend, written about 1260. The former was the more likely source for Boccaccio.

Third tale (IX, 3)
Master Simone, at the insistence of Bruno and Buffalmacco and Nello, makes Calandrino believe that he is pregnant. Calandrino, accordingly, gives them capons and money for medicines, and is cured without being delivered.

Filostrato narrates this humorous story.

Fourth tale (IX, 4)
Cecco, son of Messer Fortarrigo, loses his all at play at Buonconvento, besides the money of Cecco, son of Messer Angiulieri; whom, running after him in his shirt and crying out that he has robbed him, he causes to be taken by peasants: he then puts on his clothes, mounts his palfrey, and leaves him to follow in his shirt.

Neifile is the narrator of this tale.

Fifth tale (IX, 5)
Calandrino falls in love with Niccolosa, the wife of the master of the house. Bruno gives him a scroll, averring that, if he touches her with it, she will do anything he says. They are discovered together by his wife, Tessa, who proceeds to beat and scratch him. Bruno and Buffalmacco, who told Tessa of the affair to begin with, laugh at Calandrino`s misfortune.

Sixth tale (IX, 6)

Two young men lodge at an inn, of whom the one lies with the host's daughter, his wife accidentally lying with the other. He that lay with the daughter afterwards gets into her father's bed and tells him all, taking him to be his comrade. They exchange words: whereupon the good woman, apprehending the circumstances, gets her to bed with her daughter, and by divers apt words re-establishes perfect accord.

Panfilo's tale comes from Jean Bodel's fabliau "Gombert et les deus Clers", a story also used by Chaucer for The Reeve's Tale.

Seventh tale (IX, 7)
Talano di Molese dreams that a wolf tears and rends all the neck and face of his wife: he gives her warning thereof, which she heeds not, and the dream comes true.

Pampinea narrates this tale, for which no known earlier source exists.

Eighth tale (IX, 8)
Biondello and Ciacco both live a wealthier life than they can afford, which makes them rivals. Biondello tells Ciacco the wrong location of a breakfast: for which prank Ciacco is cunningly avenged on Biondello, causing him to be shamefully beaten by Filippo Argenti. They finally come to a truce.

Lauretta acts as the narrator of this novella.

Ninth tale (IX, 9)
Two young men ask counsel of Solomon; the one, how he is to make himself beloved, the other, how he is to reduce an unruly wife to order. The King bids the one to love, and the other to go to the Bridge of Geese. The one bid to love finds true love in return. The other observes a mule train crossing the bridge and sees that by beating a stubborn mule, the herder persuades it to cross the bridge. Upon returning home, he employs the same tactics on his wife; beating her senseless when she refuses to make what he wants for dinner. He wakes the next day to a hot breakfast and returns home that evening to his favorite meal. It appears he has cured his wife of her stubbornness.

Emilia narrates this tale, which probably originated in Asia.

Tenth tale (IX, 10)
Dom Gianni at the instance of his gossip Pietro uses an enchantment to transform Pietro's wife Gemmata into a mare; but, when he comes to attach the tail, Gossip Pietro, by saying that he will have none of the tail, makes the enchantment of no effect.

Dioneo's bawdy story from a French fabliau, "De la demoiselle qui vouloit voler en l'air."

Tenth day
Panfilo is the king of the last day of storytelling and he orders the company to tell stories about deeds of munificence. These tales seem to escalate in their degrees of munificence until the end, where the day (and the entire Decameron) reaches an apex in the story of patient Griselda.

First tale (X, 1)
A knight in the service of the King of Spain deems himself ill requited. Wherefore the King, by most cogent proof, shows him that the blame rests not with him, but with the knight's own evil fortune; after which, he bestows upon him a noble gift.

Neifile's story is one of the most widely diffused ones in the entire collection. Its origins come from two different stories. The first part (the comparison of the king to a mule) comes from Busone de'Raffaelli da Gubbio's "Fortunatus Siculus," written about 1333 in Italian. The second part (concerning the caskets, known to English speakers from Shakespeare's The Merchant of Venice) originates from about 800 AD from Joannes Damascensus's account of Barlaam and Josaphat and was written in Greek. Boccaccio most likely was inspired, though, by the Gesta Romanorum.

Second tale (X, 2)

Ghino di Tacco captures the Abbot of Cluny, cures him of a disorder of the stomach, and releases him. The abbot, on his return to the court of Rome, reconciles Ghino with Pope Boniface, and makes him prior of the Hospital.

Elissa narrates. Ghino di Tacco is the Italian equivalent of the English Robin Hood, with the difference that di Tacco was a real person whose deeds as a chief of a band of robbers passed into legend. He lived in the latter half of the 13th century. Boccaccio's tale, though, is one of many legends that grew up around him.

Third tale (X, 3)
Nathan, an elderly rich man of Cathay, is noted for his exceeding generosity towards the guests of his house on the road leading out of the capital. Mithridanes, a wealthy young man living not far from Nathan, attempts to emulate him, but is frustrated and resolves to kill him. Falling in with Nathan unawares, Nathan advises Mithridanes how to compass his end. Following Nathan's advice, he finds the older gentleman in a copse, and recognizing him, is shame-stricken, and becomes his friend.

Filostrato tells this tale. He attributes it to "various Genoese", but this may be seen as a reluctance to credit Marco Polo (as a Venetian an enemy of Florence and greatly disdained by Boccaccio personally); although no specific tale resembling this one appears in Polo's writings, his reports of Kublai Khan's generosity are likely the inspiration for the tale.

Fourth tale (X, 4)
Messer Gentile de' Carisendi, from Modena, disinters a lady that he loves, who has been buried for dead. She, being reanimated, gives birth to a male child; and Messer Gentile restores her, with her son, to Niccoluccio Caccianimico, her husband.

Lauretta gives this story, for which there is no clear surviving source. The story is a bit similar to the Florentine legend of Ginevra degli Amieri, set in the last decade of 14th century, but published no earlier than at the turn of the 16th century.

Fifth tale (X, 5)

Messer Ansaldo is in love with Madonna Dianora, a married woman, and often sends her messages of his love.  She does not return his affections, and in an attempt to put him off says that she will only be his if he can prove his love by providing for her a garden as fair in January as it is in May.  Messer Ansaldo hires for a great sum a necromancer, and thereby gives her the garden. Madonna Dianora tells her husband of her promise, and he says that, while he would prefer that she remain faithful to him if possible, she must keep her word to Messer Ansaldo.  When Messer Ansaldo learns of this he releases her from her promise and she returns to her husband.  From then on Messer Ansaldo felt only honorable affection for Madonna Dianora.  The necromancer is impressed by this and refuses to take any payment from Messer Ansaldo.

Emilia narrates. This tale is found in later manuscripts of the Śukasaptati. It is found in several story collections from Asia and in many languages.

Sixth tale (X, 6)
King Charles the Old, being conqueror, falls in love with a young maiden, and afterward growing ashamed of his folly bestows her and her sister honourably in marriage.

Fiammetta narrates.

Seventh tale (X, 7)

King Pedro, being apprised of the fervent love borne him by Lisa Puccini, who thereof is sick, comforts her, and forthwith gives her in marriage to a young gentleman, and having kissed her on the brow, professes himself her knight ever after.

Pampinea tells this tale. No earlier versions are known, although there may have been a folk tale based on the adventures of Macalda di Scaletta with King Pedro.

Eighth tale (X, 8)
Sophronia, albeit she deems herself wife to Gisippus, is wife to Titus Quintius Fulvus, and goes with him to Rome, where Gisippus arrives in indigence, and deeming himself scorned by Titus, to compass his own death, avers that he has slain a man. Titus recognizes him, and to save his life, alleges that 'twas he that slew the man: whereof he that did the deed being witness, he discovers himself as the murderer. Whereby it comes to pass that they are all three liberated by Octavianus; and Titus gives Gisippus his sister to wife, and shares with him all his substance.

Filomena narrates this story, which Boccaccio may have taken from Alphonsus's "Disciplina clericalis." However, its ultimate source is from the East, although there are disputes as to exactly where or when.

Ninth tale (X, 9)
Saladin, the Sultan, in guise of a merchant, is honourably entreated by Messer Torello. The Crusade ensuing, Messer Torello appoints a date, after which his wife may marry again: he is taken prisoner by Saladin, and by training hawks comes under Saladin's notice. Saladin recognizes him, makes himself known to him, and entreats him with all honor. Messer Torello falls sick, and by magic arts is transported in a single night to Pavia, where his wife's second marriage is then to be solemnized, and being present thereat, is recognized by her, and returns with her to his house.

Panfilo is the narrator of this tale.

Tenth tale (X, 10)

The Marquis of Saluzzo, Gualtieri, overborne by the entreaties of his vassals, consents to take a wife, but, being minded to please himself in the choice of her, takes a husbandman's daughter, Griselda. He has two children by her, both of whom he makes her believe that he has put to death. Afterward, feigning to be tired of her, and to have taken another wife, he turns her out of doors in her shift, and brings his daughter into the house in guise of his bride; but, finding her patient under it all, he brings her home again, and shows her children, now grown up, and honours her, and causes her to be honoured, as Marchioness.

Dioneo tells the final (and possibly most retold) story of the Decameron. Although Boccaccio was the first to record the story, he almost certainly did not invent it. Petrarch mentions having heard it many years before, but not from Boccaccio. Therefore, it was probably already circulating in oral tradition when the Decameron was written. Petrarch later retold the story in Latin, which is probably the biggest factor that contributed to its huge popularity in subsequent centuries.

Conclusion
The work concludes rather abruptly. Boccaccio, as he does in the introduction of the fourth day, defends his work against detractors. However, this time he does it in a humorous and sacrilegious way.

See also
Allegory in the Middle Ages

References

 Brown University's Decameron Web
 Lee, A. C., The Decameron: Its Sources and Analogues, 1903
 Boccaccio, Giovanni. The Decameron. New York City, New York: Penguin Group, 1982. Print.
 Boccaccio, Giovanni. The Decameron, Translated by J M Rigg. London, 1903.

External links

Culture in Florence
Medieval Italian literature
Storytelling
Summary